The Deceiver is a 1931 American pre-Code mystery film directed by Louis King. It was written by Jack Cunningham, based on a short story called "It Might Have Happened" by Bella Muni and Abem Finkel. The film stars Lloyd Hughes, Ian Keith and Dorothy Sebastian. John Wayne makes a minor appearance as a stand-in playing Ian Keith's corpse. It featured songs and tap dance numbers in an act billed as "Hot Harlem". The film premiered on November 21, 1931.

Plot

Cast

See also
List of American films of 1931

References

External links

1930s mystery drama films
1931 drama films
1931 films
American black-and-white films
American mystery drama films
Columbia Pictures films
Films directed by Louis King
1930s English-language films
1930s American films